Sar Tang-e Kuchak (also Romanized as Sar Tang-e Kūchak; also known as Sar Tang-e Soflá) is a village in Jowzar Rural District, in the Central District of Mamasani County, Fars Province, Iran. At the 2006 census, its population was 103, in 23 families.

References 

Populated places in Mamasani County